Ogbono soup is a Nigerian dish made with ground dry ogbono seeds. Ogbono seeds (the local name for Irvingia) are originated and were first grown in Southern Nigeria with considerable local variation. According to research by Chris Chinaka and J.C. Obiefuna, Ogbono is an indigenous forest tree associated with plants classified as 'non-timber forest products. It goes by various indigenous names in Nigeria. In the Igbo speaking region it is called 'ogbono/ugiri' depending on the variety of Igbo. In Nupe, it is called 'pekpeara', 'ogwi' in Bini, 'uyo' in Efik, and 'oro' in Yoruba.

The ground ogbono seeds are used as a thickener, and give the soup a black coloration.  Besides seeds, water and palm oil, it typically contains meat and/or fish seasonings such as chili pepper, leaf vegetables and other vegetables. Typical leaf vegetables include bitterleaf and celosia.  Typical other vegetables include tomatoes and okra.  Typical seasonings include chiles, onions, and iru (fermented locust beans). Typical meats include beef, goat, fish, chicken, bush meat, shrimp, or crayfish. 

It can be eaten with fufu, or with pounded yam. In other countries the soup may be available in packaged prepared form in some markets that specialize in Western African foods. Ogbono soup has a mucilaginous draw texture, similar to okra soup.

See also

 List of African dishes
 List of soups
 Nigerian cuisine

References

Further reading

External links 
Ogbono soup recipe on Chef Lola's Kitchen

African soups
Nigerian cuisine
Igbo cuisine
Yoruba cuisine
Chicken soups